Adiantum gertrudis is a threatened species of ferns in the Vittarioideae subfamily of the Pteridaceae that occurs in central South America. One locus of occurrence of A. gertrudis is within central Chile at the La Campana National Park. A morphological trait unique to A. gertrudis is the hairs covering its fronds.

References

 Chilebosque (2011) Adiantum gertrudis species information.
 Michael Hassler and Brian Swale (2002) Adiantum genus 
 C. Michael Hogan (2008) Chilean Wine Palm: Jubaea chilensis, GlobalTwitcher.com, ed. N. Stromberg

gertrudis
Flora of Chile